The 'State of Maryland Meritorious Civilian Service Medal' is an honor bestowed on civilians - including civilian employees, family members and others - to recognize outstanding service to the Maryland Military Department, the Maryland National Guard or the State of Maryland. The honorary award was redesigned in 2008.

References

Awards and decorations of the National Guard (United States)